Lapua Radio and TV-Mast is a mast in Lapua, Finland.

See also
List of tallest structures in Finland

Notes

Towers completed in 1961
Communication towers in Finland
Radio masts and towers in Europe
Transmitter sites in Finland
1961 establishments in Finland